Dong'an District is a district of the city of Mudanjiang, Heilongjiang province, People's Republic of China.

Administrative divisions
There are five subdistricts and one town in the district: 

Qixing Subdistrict, Xin'an Subdistrict, Chang'an Subdistrict, Wuxing Subdistrict, Dongxing Subdistrict, Xinglong Town

Notes and references 

Dong'an
Mudanjiang